Isene is a surname. Notable people with the surname include:

Geir Isene (born 1966), Norwegian writer and business consultant
Ola Isene (1898–1973), Norwegian opera singer and actor
Ola Stunes Isene (born 1995), Norwegian discus thrower